Long Island Sound is a large marine estuary in the Northeastern United States. It forms the border between New York's Long Island and Connecticut. It is diverse and serves as a breeding ground. Many species live there.

Sponges (Porifera) 
 Clathria prolifera = Red Beard Sponge
 Halichondria panicea = Breadcrumb Sponge
 Halichondria bowerbanki = Yellow sun sponge
 Haliclona loosanoffi = Erect Sponge
 Haliclona oculata = Mermaid's Glove
 Isodictya palmata = Finger Sponge
 Polymastia robusta
 Cliona celata

Comb Jellies (Ctenophora) 
 Pleurobrachia pileus = Sea Gooseberry

Jellyfish (Cnidaria: Medusozoa) 
 Aurelia aurita = Moon Jelly
 Chrysaora quinquecirrha = Sea Nettle
 Cyanea capillata = Lion's Mane Jellyfish
 Physalia physalis = Portuguese Man o' War

Corals (Cnidaria: Alcyonacea and Scleractinia) 
 Alcyonium digitatum = Dead Man's Fingers Coral
 Astrangia poculata = Northern Star Coral

Sea Anemones (Cnidaria: Actiniaria) 
 Ceriantheopsis americana = American Striped Burrowing Anemone (invasive species; native to the Pacific Ocean)
 Cerianthus borealis = Northern Burrowing Anemone
 Diadumene leucolena = Ghost Anemone
 Diadumene lineata = Orange-Striped Green Anemone
 Fagesia lineata = Lined Anemone
 Metridium senile = Frilled Anemone
 Urticina felina = Northern Red Anemone

Crustaceans (Arthropoda: Crustacea)

True Crabs (Decapoda: Brachyura) 
 Callinectes sapidus = Atlantic Blue Crab
 Carcinus maenas = European Green Crab (invasive species)
 Ovalipes ocellatus = Lady Crab
 Cancer irroratus = Atlantic Rock Crab
 Cancer borealis = Jonah Crab
 Libinia emarginata = Common Spider Crab
 Libinia dubia = Longnose Spider Crab
 Pelia Mutica = Cryptic Teardrop Crab
 Sesarma reticulatum = Marsh Crab
 Hemigrapsus sanguineus = Asian Shore Crab (invasive species)
 Uca pugnax = Atlantic Marsh Fiddler Crab
 Uca pugilator = Atlantic Sand Fiddler Crab

Other decapods 
 Homarus americanus = American Lobster
 Pagurus longicarpus = Long-Wrist Hermit Crab
 Pagurus pollicaris = Flatclaw Hermit Crab
 Crangon septemspinosa = Seven-Spined Sand Shrimp
 Palaemonetes pugio = Daggerblade Grass Shrimp
 Gilvossius setimanus = Ghost Shrimp
 Upogebia affinis = Coastal Mud Shrimp

Mantis Shrimp (Stomatopoda) 
 Squilla empusa = Atlantic Mantis Shrimp

Horseshoe Crabs (Arthropoda: Xiphosura) 
 Limulus polyphemus = Atlantic Horseshoe Crab

Cephalopods (Mollusca: Cephalopoda) 
 Illex illecebrosus = Northern Shortfin Squid
 Loligo pealei = Longfin Inshore Squid

Gastropods (Mollusca: Gastropoda)

Littorinimorpha 
This group includes filter feeders, omnivores, and predatory sea snails.
 Crepidula fornicata = Common Slipper Shell Snail
 Crepidula plana = Eastern White Slipper Shell
 Euspira heros = Northern Moonsnail
 Euspira triseriata = Spotted Moonsnail
 Neverita duplicata  = Sharkeye Moonsnail
 Littorina littorea = Common Periwinkle (invasive species; native to the European coast)
 Littorina saxatilis = Rough Periwinkle

Neogastropoda 
Most neogastropods are predatory sea snails.
 Buccinum undatum = Waved Whelk
 Busycon carica = Knobbed Whelk
 Busycotypus canaliculatus = Channeled Whelk
 Ilyanassa obsoleta = Eastern Mudsnail
 Ilyanassa trivittata = Threeline Mudsnail
 Mitrella lunata = Lunar Dovesnail
 Phrontis vibex = Bruised Nassa
 Nucella lapillus = Atlantic Dogwinkle
 Urosalpinx cinerea = Atlantic Oyster Drill
 Eupleura caudata = Thick-lip Drill
 Kurtziella cerina = Wax-Colored Mangelia

Ptenoglossa 
 Cerithiopsis greenii = Green's Cerith
 Seila adamsii = Adam's Cerith
 Retilaskeya emersonii = Awl Cerith

Bivalves (Mollusca: Bivalvia)

Pteriomorphia 
These filter feeders are either mobile or permanently attached to a substrate.
 Anadara transversa = Transverse Ark
 Anadara ovalis = Blood Ark
 Crassostrea virginica = Eastern Oyster
 Ostrea edulis = European Flat Oyster
 Mytilus edulis = Blue Mussel
 Geukensia demissa = Ribbed Mussel
 Modiolus modiolus = Northern Horsemussel
 Anomia simplex = Jingle Shell
 Argopecten irradians = Bay Scallop
 Placopecten magellanicus = Sea Scallop

Heterodonta 
These filter feeders are mostly burrowers.
 Arctica islandica = Ocean Quahog
 Mercenaria mercenaria = Northern Quahog / Hardshell Clam
 Pitar morrhuanus = False Quahog
 Spisula solidissima = Atlantic Surf Clam
 Mulinia lateralis = Dwarf Surf Clam
 Petricola pholadiformis = False Angelwing
 Mya arenaria = Softshell Clam
 Ensis directus = Atlantic Jackknife / Razor Clam
 Astarte undata = Wavy Astarte
 Astarte castanea = Smooth Astarte

Echinoderms (Echinodermata)

Sea Urchins (Echinoidea) 
 Sand dollar
 Arbacia punctulata = Atlantic Purple Sea Urchin
 Strongylocentrotus droebachiensis = Common Green Sea Urchin

Sea Cucumbers (Holothuroidea) 
 Sclerodactyla briareus = Hairy Sea Cucumber

Starfish (Asteroidea) 
 Crossaster papposus = Spiny Sunstar
 Solaster endeca = Purple Sunstar
 Pteraster militaris = Winged Sea Star
 Hippasteria phrygiana = Horse Star
 Leptasterias tenera = Slender Seastar
 Asterias vulgaris = Northern Seastar
 Asterias forbesi = Common Seastar
 Henricia sanguinolenta = Blood Star

Brittle Stars (Ophiuroidea) 
 Ophioderma Brevispinum = Shortspined Brittlestar
 Ophiopholis Aculeata = Daisy Brittlestar
 Amphioplus abditus = Burrowing Brittlestar
 Axiognathus squamata = Little Brittlestar
 Gorgonocephalus arcticus = Northern Basketstar

Sea Squirts (Chordata: Tunicata) 
 Didemnum spp
 Molgula manhattensis = Sea Grape
 Styela clava = Asian stalked Tunicate
 Botryllus schlosseri = Golden Star Tunicate
 Botrylloides violaceus = Compound Tunicate

Cartilaginous Fish (Chordata: Chondrichthyes)

Sharks (Selachimorpha)

Resident Sharks 
 Carcharhinus leucas = Bull Shark
 Carcharhinus plumbeus = Sandbar Shark
 Mustelus canis = Dusky Smoothhound Shark / Smooth Dogfish
 Odontaspis taurus = Sand Tiger Shark
 Squalus acanthias = Spiny Dogfish

Visitor Sharks 
 Carcharhinus obscurus = Dusky Shark
 Prionace glauca = Blue Shark
 Sphyrna zygaena = Smooth Hammerhead Shark
 Alopias vulpinus = Common Thresher Shark
 Carcharodon carcharias = Great White Shark

Skates and Rays (Batoidea) 
 Dasyatis centroura = Roughtail Stingray
 Raja eglanteria = Clearnose Skate
 Raja erinacea = Little Skate
 Dipturus laevis = Barndoor Skate
 Leucoraja ocellata = Winter Skate

Bony Fish (Chordata: Osteichthyes)

Eels (Anguilliformes) 
 Anguilla rostrata = American Eel

Gadiformes 
 Enchelyopus cimbrius = Four-Bearded Rockling
 Microgadus tomcod = Atlantic Tomcod
 Urophycis chuss = Red Hake

Seahorses and Pipefishes (Syngnathiformes) 
 Hippocampus erectus = Northern Lined Seahorse
 Syngnathus fuscus = Northern Pipefish

Jacks (Carangiformes: Carangidae) 
 Caranx hippos = Crevalle Jack, Jack Crevalle, Common Jack
 Caranx crysos = Blue Runner, Hardnose
 Carangoides bartholomaei = Yellow Jack, Coolihoo
 Chloroscombrus chrysurus = Atlantic Bumper

Flatfish (Pleuronectiformes) 
 Etropus microstomus = Smallmouth Flounder
 Paralichthys dentatus = Fluke
 Pleuronectes ferruginea = Yellowtail Flounder
 Pseudopleuronectes americanus = Winter Flounder
 Scophthalmus aquosus = Windowpane Flounder
 Trinectes maculatus = Hogchoker

Scorpaeniformes 
 Hemitripterus americanus = Atlantic Sea Raven
 Myoxocephalus aenaeus = Grubby Sculpin
 Myoxocephalus octodecemspinosus = Longhorn Sculpin
 Prionotus carolinus = Northern Sea Robin
 Prionotus evolans = Striped Sea Robin
 Pterois volitans = Red Lionfish (invasive species)

Wrasses (Labriformes: Labridae) 
 Tautoga onitis = Blackfish, Tautog
 Tautogolabrus adspersus = Cunner Wrasse, Bergall

Perciformes

Drums (Sciaenidae) 
 Cynoscion regalis = Weakfish, Seatrout
 Menticirrhus saxatilis = Northern Kingfish, Northern Kingcroaker, Whiting
 Sciaenops ocellatus = Red Drum, Redfish, Puppy Drum, Channel Bass, Red, Spottail Bass
 Pogonias cromis = Black Drum, "Big Ugly", Drum, Drummer
 Leiostomus xanthurus = Spot, Spot Croaker
 Micropogonias undulatus = Atlantic Croaker

Other Perciformes 
 Centropristis striata = Black Sea Bass
 Morone saxatilis = Striped Bass
 Pholis gunnellus = Rock Gunnel
 Pomatomus saltatrix = Bluefish
 Stenotomus chrysops = Scup
 Ulvaria subbifurcata = Radiated Shanny

Anglerfish (Lophiiformes) 
 Dibranchus atlanticus = Atlantic Batfish
 Lophius americanus = American Anglerfish

Tetraodontiformes 
All of the animals in this category are summer visitors, who migrate northwards from warmer waters in the south.
 Balistes capriscus = Grey Triggerfish
 Chilomycterus schoepfii = Striped Burrfish
 Mola mola = Ocean Sunfish
 Sphoeroides maculatus = Northern Pufferfish
 Stephanolepis hispidus = Planehead Filefish

Miscellaneous Percomorpha 
 Ammodytes americanus = American Sand Lance
 Apeltes quadracus = Four-Spined Stickleback (found in fresh and brackish water)
 Fundulus majalis = Striped Killifish
 Menidia menidia = Atlantic Silverside
 Opsanus tau = Oyster Toadfish
 Peprilus triacanthus = Atlantic Butterfish, American Butterfish

References

Further reading 
 
 
 
 

Long Island Sound
Long Island Sound
Lists of fauna of New York (state)
Long Island Sound